Los Guerreros Laguneros (Spanish for "The Warriors from the Lagoon") is a lucha libre stable based in Consejo Mundial de Lucha Libre (CMLL). The stable was created in 2001 and has, since its inception, been led by Último Guerrero and has been the top rudo stable in CMLL. Los Guerreros Laguneros currently consists of Último Guerrero, his younger brother Gran Guerrero and Templario.

The group originally was created as a splinter group of Los Infernales founded by Último Guerrero, Rey Bucanero and Tarzan Boy. The group initially used the "Los Infernales" name until they were forced to change their name in 2001. At that point the group adopted the name Los Guerreros del Infierno ("The Infernal Warriors"). When Atlantis joined the group in 2005 they adopted the name Los Guerreros de la Atlantida ("The Warriors of Atlantis"), which was used interchangeably with the "Guerreros del Infierno" name. In 2011 Atlantis departed the group and it was renamed Los Guerreros Laguneros, referring to the fact that all members of the group were from the Lagunero area of Mexico. Since its inception various members of the team have held the CMLL World Tag Team Championship and the CMLL World Trios Championship as well as several individual championships. From 2004 until 2007 Los Guerreros were associated with Pandilla Guerrera ("Gang of Warriors"), a lower ranked group of wrestlers.

Group history

Los Infernales (2001)

In 1999 El Satánico reformed the group Los Infernales, recruiting Último Guerrero and Rey Bucanero; Bucanero's uncle Pirata Morgan had been part of the original Los Infernales. Working with the veteran El Satánico allowed both Rey Bucanero and Último Guerrero to rise up the ranks as well as develop into a regular tag team in CMLL. In the summer of 2000 Bucanero and Guerrero were one of sixteen teams entered into a tournament for the vacant CMLL World Tag Team Championship. In the end they defeated Villano IV and Mr. Niebla to win the championship.

Throughout the summer of 2000 El Satánico had been working a storyline against Tarzan Boy, which was used to turn both Bucanero and Último Guerrero against El Satánico. Bucanero, Guerrero and Tarzan Boy claimed that they deserved the name Los Infernales and that El Satánico was holding them back. For the storyline El Satánico recruited two other wrestlers to even the numbers, which on TV was presented as if he used his "Satanic powers" to transform Rencor Latino into Averno ("Hell") and Astro Rey Jr. into Mephisto. When Tarzan Boy was injured and unable to wrestle Bucanero and Guerrero recruited Máscara Mágica to even the numbers. The storyline between the two factions reaches its high point at the CMLL 68th Anniversary Show where all seven wrestlers faced off in a steel cage match. The stipulation of the match was that the winning side would gain the rights to use the name Los Infernales while the loser on the opposite side would be forced to unmask or have their hair shaved off. In the end El Satánico pinned Máscara Mágica, forcing him to unmask. After losing the match Guerrero, Bucanero and Tarzan Boy became known collectively as Los Guerreros del Infierno ("The Infernal Soldiers").

Los Guerreros del Infierno (2001–2005)
Finally, Satánico's Infernales retained their name and the name Guerreros del Infierno was adopted by Guerrero, Bucanero and Tarzan Boy. Soon GdI was the powerful rudo trio in CMLL. Bucanero and Guerrero successfully took the Tag Team Titles from the respected veterans Negro Casas and El Hijo del Santo. Último was successful in taking the CMLL Light Heavyweight Title (the most prestigious singles title in the promotion) by defeating Shocker.  Tarzan Boy went on to main event the CMLL 70th Anniversary Show against Shocker in a Caballera contra Caballera match. Tarzan lost the match and his hair.

2004 was a tough year for the Guerreros. Guerrero and Bucanero lost and then regained the tag titles from L. A. Park and Shocker. Then Bucanero suffered a knee injury when his leg was caught in a seat and he was hit by a dive. Tarzan began teaming with Pierroth Jr. and Vampiro Canadiense to create a new top (in CMLL's eyes at least) heel trio. When Bucanero returned, they quickly lost the tag titles to Atlantis and Blue Panther. Tarzan soon started teaming with yet another trio called La Furia del Norte with Héctor Garza and Perro Aguayo Jr. (who was later replaced by El Terrible). It was then that Último Guerrero raised an army of mid carders to counter Shocker's University de 1000% Guapo group and the two groups faced in a Torneo Cibernético. Olimpíco won the match for Los Guerreros and was considered a full-time member, helping revitalize the group. When Héctor Garza had his legal problems, Tarzan stepped back into the scene with allies Averno and Mephisto being treated like full-time members. 2005 was looking good for Los Guerreros until Olímpico injured his neck on a dive in a tag title match with Bucanero against Atlantis and Panther on the first show in Arena Mexico.

Los Guerreros de Atlantida (2005–2011)

In September, Averno and Mephisto took the CMLL tag titles back for the Guerreros, just weeks after Doctor X, Sangre Azteca and Nitro managed to finally wrestle away the National Trios Titles away from Volador Jr., Felino and Safari after several unsuccessful attempts.

On May 28, 2006, in Arena Coliseo, Bucanero turned against Guerrero and Tarzan Boy during a match with Negro Casas, Heavy Metal and Místico, bringing a temporary end to the trios. Later on, Tarzan Boy would turn tecnicó and compete under the name "Toscano". Último Guerrero and Atlantis kept the Guerreros del Infierno name alive, even after Olímpico left CMLL and the group of mid-carders broke away to form Los Guerreros Tuareg. In 2008 Rey Bucanero returned to the group making Los Guerreros del Infierno a trio once more.

On November 2, 2010, Dragón Rojo Jr. replaced an injured Atlantis and teamed with Último Guerrero to defeat Mr. Águila and Hector Garza for the CMLL World Tag Team Championship. After the match it was announced that Dragón Rojo Jr. had left his old stable Poder Mexica to become the newest member of Los Guerreros de la Atlantida. On April 8, 2011, Último Guerrero and Escorpión won CMLL's Torneo Gran Alternativa, an eight tag team tournament where veterans form teams with newcomers. Following the win, Escorpion joined Los Guerreros de la Atlantida under the new ring name Rey Escorpión.

Los Guerreros Laguneros (2011–present)
After weeks of tension between Atlantis and Último Guerrero, CMLL held a press conference on August 11, where Atlantis officially turned técnico and left Los Guerreros de la Atlantida. The following day, Guerrero lost the CMLL World Heavyweight Championship to Héctor Garza, who also turned at the same press conference, ending his reign at 963 days, the third longest in the title's history. In July 2012, Guerrero officially kicked Rey Escorpión from Los Guerreros del Infierno, though he had turned on the group weeks earlier, and named Euforia and Niebla Roja as his replacements. On August 3, Guerrero and Rojo  Jr. lost the CMLL World Tag Team Championship to Atlantis and Diamante Azul, ending their reign at 640 days, the longest reign in the title's history. During the celebration of Atlantis' 30th anniversary as a wrestler Guerrero appeared after a match to berate Atlantis, which turned out to only be a distraction for the real Último Guerrero to attack Atlantis from behind. The two identically dressed Guerreros proceeded to beat up Atlantis and tear his mask apart. Following the match Último Guerrero introduced his brother "Gran Guerrero". It has not been verified if Gran Guerrrero actually is the brother of Último Guerrero, someone not related to Guerrero, or as speculated by many his son who wrestled for CMLL as Taurus. On May 9, 2013 Gran Guerrero was officially introduced as an addition to Los Guerreros del Infierno. On March 28, 2014, Guerrero, Euforia and Niebla Roja defeated Los Estetas del Aire (Máscara Dorada, Místico and Valiente) to win the CMLL World Trios Championship. They lost the title to Sky Team (Místico, Valiente and Volador Jr.) on February 13, 2015.

In the spring of 2017 CMLL began a storyline where Niebla Roja started having problems with his fellow Los Guerreros Laguneros teammates, initially by accidentally causing them to lose matches due to miscommunication between Niebla Roja and Euforia and Gran Guerrero. As the storyline progressed Niebla Roja refused to participate in Los Guerreros rudo antics such as double or triple teaming an opponent. On May 19 Niebla Roja's tecnico turn was completed as he kicked Los Guerreros leader Último Guerrero in the face during a match. Afterward Último Guerrero and Gran Guerrero beat Niebla Roja up, tore his mask off and demanded that Niebla Roja had to come up with a new mask instead of wearing the Último Guerrero inspired mask. During the attack he was aided by his brother Ángel de Oro.

On July 1, 2018, Los Guerreros Laguneros ended Sky Team's 1,223-day reign with the CMLL World Trios Championship as they defeated them in the main event of CMLL's Domingos Arena México show. Subsequently, Los Guerreros were positioned as "Defenders of CMLL" as they began a storyline feud with The Cl4n (Ciber the Main Man, The Chrizh and Sharlie Rockstar), three wrestlers who had made a name for themselves in CMLL's main rival Lucha Libre AAA Worldwide. On September 14, The Cl4n won the World Trios Championship, but Los Guerreros won the championship back two weeks later on September 28.  On November 23, Los Guerreros introduced Templario as their newest member, pronouncing him an adopted Lagunero even though he was not from the Lagoon area. On March 26, 2021, they lost the World Trios Championship to Nueva Generación Dinamita, resulting in Euforia turning on Último Guerrero and leaving the stable.

Members

Current

Former

Timeline

Championships and accomplishments

Only titles won when they were members of Los Guerreros are listed.
Consejo Mundial de Lucha Libre
CMLL World Heavyweight Championship – Último Guerrero (2 times)
CMLL World Middleweight Championship – Dragón Rojo Jr. (1 time)
CMLL World Light Heavyweight Championship – Último Guerrero (1 time)
CMLL World Tag Team Championship (7 times)– Atlantis and Último Guerrero (1 time), Último Guerrero and Rey Bucanero (3 times), Último Guerrero and Dr. Wagner Jr.  (1 time), Último Guerrero and Dragón Rojo Jr. (1 time) Euforia and Gran Guerrero (1 time)
CMLL World Trios Championship – Atlantis, Último Guerrero and Tarzan Boy (1 time), Atlantis, Último Guerrero and Negro Casas (1 time), Euforia, Niebla Roja and Último Guerrero (1 time), Euforia, Gran Guerrero and Último Guerrero (2 times)
Mexican National Middleweight Championship – Templario (1 time, current)
Mexican National Welterweight Championship – Sangre Azteca (1 time)
NWA World Historic Middleweight Championship – Dragón Rojo Jr. (1 time)
NWA World Light Heavyweight Championship – Tarzan Boy (1 time)
CMLL Universal Championship – Último Guerrero (2014)
Reyes del Aire: 2020 – Templario
Wrestling Observer Newsletter awards
Best Tag Team of the Decade (2000–2009) – Rey Bucanero and Último Guerrero

Footnotes

References

Consejo Mundial de Lucha Libre teams and stables